Allan Waithaka is an Anglican bishop in Kenya: he has been an Assistant Bishop in the Anglican Diocese of Mount Kenya Central since 2002.

References

21st-century Anglican bishops of the Anglican Church of Kenya
Anglican bishops of Mount Kenya Central
Year of birth missing (living people)
Living people